Marco Schwarz (born 16 August 1995) is an Austrian World Cup alpine ski racer. He focuses on the technical events of slalom and giant slalom, as well as the combined (a mixture of speed and technical disciplines).

Career
Schwarz competed for Austria at the 2012 Winter Youth Olympics in the alpine skiing and won three gold medals; in the boys' combined,  the parallel mixed team event, and the boys' giant slalom.

Schwarz made his World Cup debut in November 2014 at age 19. He achieved his first World Cup podium in December 2015; third place in a slalom at Madonna di Campiglio, Italy, behind winner Henrik Kristoffersen and runner-up Marcel Hirscher.

World Cup results

Season titles
 1 title  – (1 SL)

Season standings

Race podiums
 5 wins – (2 SL, 1 GS, 1 PS, 1 AC)
 19 podiums – (12 SL, 3 GS, 1 SG, 2 PS, 1 AC)

World Championship results
{| class="wikitable" style="font-size:95%; text-align:center; border:grey solid 1px; border-collapse:collapse;" width="40%"
|- style="background-color:#369; color:white;"
|rowspan="2" colspan="1" width="4%"|Year
|- style="background-color:#4180be; color:white;"
| width="3%"|Age
| width="5%"|Slalom
| width="5%"|GiantSlalom
| width="5%"|Super-G
| width="5%"|Downhill
| width="5%"|Combined
| width="5%"|Parallel
| width="4%"|Teamevent
|- style="background-color:#8CB2D8; color:white;"
|-
|-
| 2017 || 21 || 7 || — || — || — || — || rowspan=2  || —
|-
| 2019 || 23 || style="background:#cc9966;"|3 || 5 || — || — ||style="background:#cc9966;"| 3 || style="background:silver;"|2
|-
| 2021 || 25 || DNF2 || style="background:#cc9966;"|3 || — || — ||bgcolor=gold| 1 || 18|| —
|-
| 2023 || 27 || 6 || bgcolor=cc9966|3 || 6 ||4|| style="background:silver;"|2 || —|| —
|}

Olympic results

References

External links

1995 births
Austrian male alpine skiers
Living people
Alpine skiers at the 2012 Winter Youth Olympics
Alpine skiers at the 2018 Winter Olympics
Alpine skiers at the 2022 Winter Olympics
Olympic alpine skiers of Austria
Medalists at the 2018 Winter Olympics
Olympic medalists in alpine skiing
Olympic silver medalists for Austria
Sportspeople from Villach
Youth Olympic gold medalists for Austria